The 2015–16 Football League is the second division of the Greek professional football system and the sixth season under the name Football League after previously being known as Beta Ethniki.  Its season began on 27 September 2015 and ended on 29 May 2016.

Teams

* withdrew during the season

Notes
OFI and Niki Volos  withdrew from the league. As a result of this they will participate in 2015–16 Gamma Ethniki.

Structure
There are eighteen clubs that compete in the Football League, playing each other in a home and away series. At the end of the season, the bottom four teams are relegated to Gamma Ethniki. The top two teams gain automatic promotion for Super League. All teams in the Football League take part in the Greek Football Cup.

League table

Matches

1 The game awarded a 3–0  win to Chania.
2 The opponents of Ergotelis awarded a 3–0  win each.
3 The opponents of Olympiakos Volos awarded a 3–0  win each.
4 The game awarded a 3–0  win to Kerkyra.

Season statistics

Top scorers
Updated to games played 29 May 2016

References

2
Second level Greek football league seasons
Greece